Satya Prakash (born 1929) is an Indian plasma physicist and a former senior professor at the Physical Research Laboratory. He is known for his studies on Langmuir probes and other contributions in space and plasma sciences. A protégé of Vikram Sarabhai, Satya Prakash is an elected fellow of all the three major Indian science academies such as Indian Academy of Sciences, Indian National Science Academy and National Academy of Sciences, India as well as the Gujarat Science Academy and is a recipient of the Hari Om Ashram Prerit Senior Scientist Award. The Government of India honored him with Padma Shri, the fourth highest Indian civilian award for his contributions to the discipline of Physics, in 1982.

Biography 
Satya Prakash was born on 1 July 1929, at Najibabad, Uttar Pradesh, India. He is a Physicist and has done pioneering work in the study of Solar time variation of Cosmic Ray Neutrons, the study of the equatorial ionospheric D, E and F region using space borne as well as ground based techniques. In recognition to these researches, he was awarded the First Hari Om Prerit Vikram Sarabhai award during 1975 and was decorated with Padma Shree award during 1982 by the President of India. In recognition he was elected as fellows of all the three important Indian Academies. He was elected as a Fellow of INSA during 1983. Later on he was also elected a fellow of Indian Academy of Sciences Bangalore, National Academy of Sciences, Allahabad, and Gujarat Science Academy.  
Satya Prakash earned his bachelor's degree and master's degree in Science from Allahabad University in 1951, joined Physical Research Laboratory (PRL) Ahmedabad and worked on Solar influence on the cosmic ray neutrons under the supervision of Prof. Vikram Sarabhai. For his studies, which was during the International Geophysical year he developed and established neutron piles at Kodaikanal and Gulmarg to measure cosmic ray produced neutrons. For the neutron counters used in the pile, he developed an all cooper metal system for purification of highly corrosive BF3 gas used in the counters. After his Ph D degree from Gujarat University, he continued his cosmic ray studies at National Research Council Canada  as a Post- Doctoral fellow with Prof. I. B. Mc. Diarmid during 1958–60 and worked on the development of cosmic ray neutron detectors at California Institute of Technology as Post- Doctoral fellow with Prof. H.V. Neher during 1960–62.
At PRL during 1962, he developed a group for in-situ studies of the upper atmospheric plasmas, plasma density irregularities and associated instability mechanisms, fields, and currents in the Equatorial Electrojet (EEJ), E and F region of the ionosphere. He indigenously developed a modified Langmuir probe and other supporting payloads that enabled him to carry out pioneering in-situ measurement of the plasma density irregularities in the EEJ leading to the identification of various plasma processes. Rocket borne payloads of Resonance probe, Electric field probe and Lyman Alpha detector with many special features were developed and used to carry out various studies. Ultraviolet monochromator and light sources were developed for the calibration of UV detectors. Payloads for the study of the energetic electrons were developed and flown on the first Indian Satellite Aryabhata. VHF radar operating at 50 MHz was developed and established at Thumba for structure and dynamics of the EEJ. Theoretical studies of the gravity wave wind generated electron density irregularities in the D, E and F region, electric field in the E region and their transmission to the F region via the geomagnetic field lines. He guided several research scholars and had many scientific publications in reputed journals.

Other contributions 
The VHF Radar developed by him at Vikram Sarabhai Space Centre, Thumba has now grown into a powerful system and is being used for the study of the EEJ and the F region dynamics. The vacuum ultraviolet monochromator, light sources, and other associated techniques development by him lead to the development of Laboratory Astrophysics group at Physical Research Laboratory (PRL). On the initiation Prof. Sarabhai and Prof. Dhawan Indian Institute of Science, he initiated jointly with Prof. Predhiman Krishan Kaw a plasma simulation experimental program of the EEJ associated plasma density irregularities at Physical Research Laboratory. This activity later developed into Institute of plasma research.

Family
Satya Prakash was married to Sushila Mittal, and has three children; Meena, Veena, and Div. Meena was born at Ottawa, Canada, while Veena and Div were both born in India.

Awards
The Indian Academy of Sciences elected Satya Prakash as an elected fellow in 1974 and later, he was elected as a fellow by the National Academy of Sciences, India and the Indian National Science Academy (1983). A fellow of the Gujarat Science Academy, Satya Prakash received the Hari Om Ashram Prerit Senior Scientist Award in 1975.The Government of India included him in the Republic Day honors list in 1982 for the fourth highest civilian award of the Padma Shri, for his contributions in the field of Physics.

Selected publications
 
 Sarabhai, V. and S. Prakash, Variation of intensity and anisotropy of cosmic ray measured at the geomagnetic equator, Pro. Ind. Acad. Sci., LI, 84-116 (1960)
 Prakash, S. and B.H.Subbaraya, Langmuir probe for the measurement of electron density and electron temperature in the ionosphere, The Review of Sci. Instr. 38, 1132 (1967)
Prakash, S., B.H.Subbaraya and S.P.Gupta, A study of equatorial E region during evening twilight using Langmuir Probe, J. Atmos. and Terr. Phys., 30, 1193 -1202 (1968)

	Prakash S., S.P.Gupta and B.H.Subbaraya, A study of irregularities in the nighttime equatorial E region using a Langmuir Probe and Plasma Noise Probe, Planet Space Sci. 18, 1307-1318 (1970)
	Prakash S., B.H.Subbaraya, S.P.Gupta, Investigation of the daytime lower ionosphere over the equator using Langmuir Probe and plasma noise probe, Jour. Atmos. Terr. Phys. 33, 129-135 (1971)
	Subbaraya B.H., S. Prakash and S.P.Gupta, Night time E-region at Thumba, Indian Journal of pure and applied Phy. 9, 8, 626-630 (1971)
	Prakash S., B.H. Subbaraya &  S.P.Gupta, Rocket measurement of ionospheric irregularities in the equatorial ionosphere at Thumba and identification of plasma irregularities, Indian J. of Radio & Space Phys., 34, 72-80 (1972).
	Subbaraya, B.H., Muralikrishna, P., Sastry, T.S.G. and Prakash, S., A study of the structure of electrical conductivities and the electrostatic field within the equatorial electrojet. Planet. Space Sci., 20, 47–52, (1972)
	Subbaraya, B.H., S. Prakash and P.N.Pareek, Molecular oxygen concentration in the equatorial mesosphere, Jour. Atmos. Terr. Phys., 34, 1141-1144 (1972)
 Height variation of the electron density and irregularity amplitudes measured at Thumba, India, around noon and midnight. [Adopted from Prakash et al. 1972].refer page 161, https://www.sciencedirect.com/book/9780124040137/the-earths-ionosphere, Kelly Book 'The earth's Ionosphere, by Michael C. Kelley. Cornell University, Ithaca, New York.
	Prakash S., B.H.Subbaraya, S.P.Gupta, Some features of equatorial D region as revealed from the Langmuir probe experiments, Space Research, XIV, 259-265(1974)
  
	Subbaraya, B.H., S. Prakash, S.P. Gupta and H.S.S. Sinha, Measurement of electron temperatures in the lower ionosphere by detecting the space potential on the Langmuir probe characteristics, Planet. and Space Sci. 22, 180–181, (1974).
 
	Rao T.R. and S. Prakash, Electron plasma resonances detected by a mutual admittance probe in equatorial ionosphere. Space Research, XVIII, 281–284, (1978)
	Prakash S., B. H. Subbaraya, Vijay Kumar, P.N. Pareek, J.S. Shirke, R.N. Misra, K.K. Goswami, R.S. Singh and A. Banerjee, The Aeronomy experiment of Aryabhatta, Proc. Indi. Acad. Sci., 321-329 (1978)
	Muralikrishna, P. and S. Prakash, Height shift in the radar echoes from the E-region around the morning and evening reversals, J. Geomag. Geoelect., 30, 125–129, (1978)
	Prakash S., R. Pandey, Interaction of gravity waves with the ionospheric plasma and the production of electric fields and currents, Proc. Indian Acad. Sci. 88A, 229-245 (1979)    
 Prakash S. and R. Pandey, Formation of electron density layers in the equatorial E region, Adv. in Space Exploration, 8, 83-86 (1980)
	Subbaraya B.H., Shyam Lal and S. Prakash, Low latitude mesospheric molecular oxygen profiles from Lyman alpha absorption measurement from Thumba. Space Research, XX, 75- 78 (1980)
	Prakash S., S.P.Gupta and B.H.Subbaraya, and R. Pandey, A review of the electron density irregularities in the equatorial D and E-region, Adv. in Space Exploration, 8, 3-16 (1980)
 
	Subbaraya, B.H., P. Muralikrishna, S. Prakash, P.V. Kulkarni, M. Herse, and G. Moreels, A Spacelab experiment for the study of gravity waves in the mesosphere, Handbook for MAP Vol. 2, ed. S.K. Avery, 483–489, (1981) 
	Muralikrishna, P., S. Prakash, and B.H. Subbaraya, Digital Processing of Spacelab Imagery, Adv. Space Res., 2., 107–110, (1983) 
	Prakash S., S. Pal and R. Pandey, Electric field and electron density measurements in the equatorial E-region, Adv. Space Res, 2, 10, 93-96 (1983)
	Prakash S., S. Pal, R. Pandey and B.H. Subbaraya, In situ studies of electron density during equatorial Spread-F, Adv. Space Res, 2, 10, 195-197(1983)
	Pal S., S. Prakash, Y.B. Acharya, R.N.Misra, A payload for the study of electric fields and electron density in the equatorial region. Adv. Space Res. 2, 7, 57-59 (1983)
	Subbaraya B.H., S. Prakash and S.P.Gupta, Electron density in the equatorial lower ionosphere from the Langmuir probe experiments conducted at Thumba during 1966 -1978, Scientific report No. ISRO-PRL-SR-15-83 of Indian Space research organization Banglore (1983)
	Prakash S., and R. Pandey, Rocket borne studies of electron density irregularities in the equatorial D and F region, Proc. Indian Acad. Sci. Earth and Planet Sci., 93, 283-308(1984)
	Prakash S., and R. Pandey, Generation of electric fields due to the gravity waves and their transmission to other ionospheric regions, Jour. Atmos. Terr. Phys., 47, 363-374 (1985)
	Prakash S. and S. Pal, Electric field and electron density irregularities in the equatorial electrojet, J. Atmos. Terrs. Phys., 47, 853-866 (1985)
	Subbaraya B.H., S. Prakash and S.P. Gupta, Structure of equatorial lower ionosphere from the Thumba Langmuir Probe Experiments, Adv. Space Res., 5, 35-38 (1985).
	Sinha H.S.S. and S. Prakash, Rocket observations of E-region ionization irregularities produced through cross-field instability mechanism - current status, Ind. J. Radio. and Space Phys., 16, 102–113, (1987). 
	Pandey R., S. Prakash and H.S.S. Sinha, Formation of Blanketing Es-layers during daytime counter electrojet over magnetic equator, J. Atmos. Terr. Phys. 54, 63–74, (1992).
	 Chandra H., G.D. Vyas, H.S.S. Sinha, R.N. Misra and S. Prakash, Ionospheric Scintillations Observations from SHAR, J. Atmos. Terr. Phys. 54, 167–172, (1992)

References

External links 
 
 
 

1929 births
Living people
20th-century Indian physicists
Recipients of the Padma Shri in science & engineering
Scientists from Uttar Pradesh
Fellows of the Indian Academy of Sciences
Fellows of The National Academy of Sciences, India
Fellows of the Indian National Science Academy
Indian plasma physicists
Indian space scientists
University of Allahabad alumni
National Research Council (Canada)
California Institute of Technology alumni